The orexin receptor (also referred to as the hypocretin receptor) is a G-protein-coupled receptor that binds the neuropeptide orexin.  There are two variants, OX1 and OX2, each encoded by a different gene.

Both orexin receptors exhibit a similar pharmacology – the 2 orexin peptides, orexin-A and orexin-B, bind to both receptors and, in each case, agonist binding results in an increase in intracellular calcium levels. However, orexin-B shows a 5- to 10-fold selectivity for orexin receptor type 2, whilst orexin-A is equipotent at both receptors.

Several orexin receptor antagonists are in development for potential use in sleep disorders. The first of these, suvorexant, has been on the market in the United States since 2015. There were two orexin agonists under development .

Ligands
Several drugs acting on the orexin system are under development, either orexin agonists for the treatment of conditions such as narcolepsy, or orexin antagonists for insomnia. In August 2015, Nagahara et al. published their work in synthesizing the first HCRT/OX2R agonist, compound 26, with good potency and selectivity.

No neuropeptide agonists are yet available, although synthetic orexin-A polypeptide has been made available as a nasal spray and tested on monkeys. One non-peptide antagonist is currently available in the U.S., Merck's suvorexant (Belsomra), two additional agents are in development: SB-649,868 by GlaxoSmithKline, for sleep disorders, and ACT-462206, currently in human clinical trials. Another drug in development, almorexant (ACT-078573) by Actelion, was abandoned due to adverse effects.  Lemborexant, an orexin receptor antagonist, was approved for use in the United States in 2019.

Most ligands acting on the orexin system so far are polypeptides modified from the endogenous agonists orexin-A and orexin-B, however there are some subtype-selective non-peptide antagonists available for research purposes.

Agonists

Non-selective
 Orexins – dual OX1 and OX2 receptor agonists
 Orexin-A – approximately equipotent at the OX1 and OX2 receptors
 Orexin-B – approximately 5- to 10-fold selectivity for the OX2 receptor over the OX1 receptor

Selective
 Danavorexton (TAK-925) – selective OX2 receptor agonist
 Firazorexton  – selective OX2 receptor agonist
 SB-668875 – selective OX2 receptor agonist
 Suntinorexton  – selective OX2 receptor agonist
 TAK-861 – selective OX2 receptor agonist
 TAK-994 – selective OX2 receptor agonist

Antagonists

Non-selective
 Almorexant (ACT-078573) – dual OX1 and OX2 receptor antagonist
 Daridorexant (Quviviq; ACT-541468) – dual OX1 and OX2 receptor antagonist
 Filorexant (MK-6096) – dual OX1 and OX2 receptor antagonist
 GSK-649868 (SB-649868) – dual OX1 and OX2 receptor antagonist
 Lemborexant (Dayvigo) – dual OX1 and OX2 receptor antagonist
 Suvorexant (Belsomra) – dual OX1 and OX2 receptor antagonist
 Vornorexant (ORN-0829, TS-142) – dual OX1 and OX2 receptor agonist

Selective
 ACT-335827 – selective OX1 receptor antagonist
 EMPA – selective OX2 receptor antagonist
 JNJ-10397049 – selective OX2 receptor antagonist
 RTIOX-276 – selective OX1 receptor antagonist
 SB-334867 – selective OX1 receptor antagonist
 SB-408124 – selective OX1 receptor antagonist
 Seltorexant (MIN-202, JNJ-42847922, JNJ-922) – selective OX2 receptor antagonist
 TCS-OX2-29 – selective OX2 receptor antagonist

References

External links

 

Protein families
G protein-coupled receptors